Cross River is a hamlet within the town of Lewisboro, New York, at the northern end of Westchester County. The hamlet is home to John Jay High School, which is one of the top-rated high schools in the United States.

References

Hamlets in Westchester County, New York